The Toddlers' Truce was an early British television scheduling policy that required transmissions to terminate for an hour each weekday between 6.00pm and 7.00pm – after the end of children's broadcasting and the start of the evening programmes – so that young children could be put to bed. The policy lasted throughout the post-war period until 16 February 1957. It was named after toddlers, children aged between 12 and 36 months.

Background
The Toddlers' Truce policy may have originated when the BBC resumed television after the end of World War II on 7 June 1946. The policy remained fairly uncontroversial until ITV began broadcasting on 22 September 1955: at that time, the Truce was accepted as policy by the Postmaster General, the Earl De La Warr interests of smoothing relations between ITV and the fledgling Independent Television Authority.

The problem became apparent in 1956, when the franchise holders under the ITA's jurisdiction were struggling to stay in business. As the BBC was (and is) funded by a television licence fee, its budget was not related to the number of hours of transmission. Indeed, the Truce saved them money. ITV on the other hand, was funded entirely by advertising, and the Truce caused a loss of revenue in the hour's closedown. Supporters of ITV, which had faced strong political opposition, argued that the Truce had little to do with social responsibility, and was simply a way to give the BBC an unfair advantage.

Abolition
The ITA had encouraged the four major companies (Granada, ABC, ATV and Associated-Rediffusion) to seek abolition of the Truce. Action was taken finally in July 1956, probably the result of a lack of effective cooperation between the companies, rather than political objection. The Postmaster General, Charles Hill disliked the policy as an example of the BBC's paternalism toward its audience:

The BBC could not be persuaded to accept the abolition, or even to a compromise of reducing the period to 30 minutes. Hill tired of the disagreement, and asked Parliament for the abolition which was agreed on 31 October 1956. However, the BBC and ITA could not even agree a date for the abolition to take place, while Hill decided on Saturday 16 February 1957.

Later use of the timeslot
The BBC filled the hour from the first Saturday with a music programme called Six-Five Special, and from Monday to Friday with the Tonight news magazine. It continued to cease broadcasts between 6.15pm and 7.00pm on Sundays at the time of evening church services, until Songs of Praise was launched on 1 October 1961. Until 1992, this time on Sundays was used for various religious programmes on BBC1 and ITV.

The slot between 6.00pm and 7.00pm has since then devoted to national and international news (especially the regional ones) in the weekday schedules of both BBC1 and ITV, although Crossroads was also shown in this period used for most ITV regions.

See also
 1946 in British television
 1957 in British television
 Timeline of the BBC Television Service
 Timeline of ITV

Sources

Further reading
 Sendall, Bernard Independent Television in Britain: Volume 1 - Origin and Foundation 1946-62 London: The Macmillan Press Ltd 1982 , Chapter 30ii: "The End of the Toddlers' Truce"

References

History of television in the United Kingdom
1946 establishments in the United Kingdom
1957 disestablishments in the United Kingdom
1940s in the United Kingdom
1940s in British television
1946 in British television
1950s in the United Kingdom
1950s in British television
1957 in British television
BBC history
History of ITV